The North London Mill is a gold mill in Park County, Colorado that commenced operations in 1883. In 1874, the first London mine was opened, named for the mountain it burrowed into. The London mines became some of the most productive mines of gold, silver and lead in the area. Between 1879 and 1889, some $82,000,000 of silver was processed in the Leadville area. Colorado Silver Boom. Due to the rugged environment and high altitude, transportation of ore between the mines and mill was difficult and costly. Thus, the first rope cable-way in Colorado was built to carry ore down the thousand-vertical-foot hill from the mine to the mill.

The North London Mill site is at 11,400 feet above sea level, West of Park City on County Road 12 (Mosquito Pass Road) outside of Alma in Park County, and has been recognized by the Park County Historic Preservation Advisory Committee as a local landmark. Mosquito Pass, at an elevation of 13,185 feet, is the highest mountain pass in North America, and its access roads are rich in mining heritage. Constructed in the late 1870s, the Mosquito Pass Road was popular despite its treacherous terrain because it is the shortest route between Fairplay and Leadville.

Restoration efforts 
A nonprofit organization, North London Mill Preservation Inc. (NoLo) was formed in 2017 with a mission to restore and repurpose the mill and surrounding buildings as an educational and recreational site. To encourage recreational use, NoLo is restoring the original office building according to Secretary of the Interior standards, transforming it into a hut with accommodations similar to those of the 10th Mountain Division Hut system.

In 2019, NoLo received a grant of $154,000 from History Colorado State Historical Fund, and $48,000 in matching funds from the Gates Family Foundation to complete exterior rehabilitation of the North London Office and prepare construction documents for the North London Mill. The preservation architects of Form+Works design group developed the preliminary drawings.

The current landowner intends to clean up the water flowing though the mine tunnels. Minewater LLC has developed a combined regulatory and technical strategy that may provide a template for reclamation of other historic abandoned mines throughout the West.

References 

Park County, Colorado
Gold mines in Colorado